Liolaemus lonquimayensis is a species of lizard in the family Iguanidae.  It is found in Chile.

References

lonquimayensis
Lizards of South America
Reptiles of Chile
Endemic fauna of Chile
Reptiles described in 2015